Mauro Di Bernardo (born 24 March 1956) is a retired Italian volleyball player. He was part of Italian teams that finished second at the 1978 World Championships and ninth at the 1980 Summer Olympics.

References

1956 births
Living people
Olympic volleyball players of Italy
Volleyball players at the 1980 Summer Olympics
Italian men's volleyball players